Stanley Thomas "Stan" Anslow (5 May 1931 in Hackney – April 2017) was an English footballer who played for Millwall in the Football League. Anslow played as a full-back.

Anslow died in April 2017, aged 85.

References

1931 births
2017 deaths
Millwall F.C. players
English Football League players
English footballers
Association football fullbacks